Horton Heath may refer to

Horton Heath, Dorset, United Kingdom
Horton Heath, Hampshire, United Kingdom